Hartford 21 was designed by the Boston-based architectural firm Childs Bertman Tseckares Inc.Turner Construction. It cost nearly $200 million to complete with $32.5 million coming in a grant from the state

There are 36 floors aboveground and three below. The building contains 262 luxury apartments as well as lower level retail and office space. It is the tallest building constructed in Hartford in the 21st century. Hartford 21 was completed in 2006, and is purported to be the tallest residential tower between New York City and Boston.XL Center, near where Asylum Street intersects Trumbull Street.

Construction and structure

Hartford 21 was designed by the Boston-based architectural firm Childs Bertman Tseckares Inc. Construction began in June 2004 and was completed in 2006 by Turner Construction. It cost nearly $200 million to complete with $32.5 million coming in a grant from the state.

There are 36 floors aboveground and three below. The building contains 262 luxury apartments as well as lower level retail and office space. It is the tallest building constructed in Hartford in the 21st century.

History 

Hartford 21 was completed in 2006, and is purported to be the tallest residential tower between New York City and Boston. It is located adjacent to the XL Center, near where Asylum Street intersects Trumbull Street.

See also
List of tallest buildings in Hartford
List of tallest buildings by U.S. state

References

Skyscrapers in Hartford, Connecticut
Residential skyscrapers in Connecticut